Kiana Jade Blanckert, (born 25 February 2007) is an Australian-Swedish singer. She participated in Talang 2021, where she placed second in the final. Kiana participated in Melodifestivalen 2023 with the song "Where Did You Go".

Personal life
Kiana was born in Perth, Australia where her mother was raised. Kiana relocated to Sweden when Kiana was two years old. She is a dual citizen of Australia and Sweden.

Discography

Singles

References

External links 

Living people
2007 births
Swedish singers
People from Perth, Western Australia
Melodifestivalen contestants of 2023